Calbourne is a village in the civil parish of Calbourne, Newtown and Porchfield, on the Isle of Wight, England. It is located 5 miles (8 km) from Newport in the west of the island.

The village takes its name from the stream that passes through town, the Caul Bourne. The stream used to power five mills just north of the town. 
In the deed for the land produced in 826 CE, it is recorded as Cawelbourne.

The village has a post office, a garage, a church and a public house, The Sun Inn. The garage is on the previous site of a blacksmith and wagonmaker. Calbourne is also the home of Westover cricket team, who play on the village green.

History

There is a privately held manor house, Westover House, on a hill overlooking Calbourne. The Westover Estate was established during the reign of Edward the Confessor. Westover House was once owned by Colonel Moulton-Barrett. Colonel Mouton-Barrett was a relative of the poet Elizabeth Barrett.

Calbourne is also close to the site of Swainston Manor, which is a mile to the east of Calbourne. Now a hotel, Swainston Manor was originally a manor house on a site dating back to 735 CE. Eight hundred years ago it became the location of a palace built by the Bishops of Winchester. It has a 12th-century chapel on its . Most of the present building was constructed in the 18th century, but an attached hall dates from the 13th century. Warwick the Kingmaker reportedly dined at Swainston Manor.

The Calbourne Mill was first mentioned in print in 1299.

Calbourne is the location of Winkle Street, a picturesque row of cottages which frequently appears on photographs and postcards of the Isle of Wight. Winkle Street looks out on the village stream. Winkle Street was originally named Barrington Row, presumably after longtime residents of Swainston, the Barrington family.

All Saints' Church, in the centre of Calbourne, was established in 826. It features a brass portrait of an armoured knight with hands folded in prayer, resting his feet on a dog. The pictured knight is thought to be William Montacure who was Earl of Salisbury and a governor of the island in the 14th century. Legend has it that Montacure was killed when he was jousting with his father. The heartbroken father created altar tombs in every church in every village in which he owned land or houses.

Today
It is linked to other parts of the Island by Southern Vectis and Community buses Yarmouth and Newport.

A fictionalised Calbourne, as "Malbourne", is the central location of Maxwell Gray's 1886 novel The Silence of Dean Maitland.

Chale articles
 W24 Calbourne
 Swainston Manor

Notes

External links

A website with pictures of Calbourne

Villages on the Isle of Wight